The F.W. Woolworth Building is a historic department store building located in Sundance Square section of downtown Fort Worth, Texas. The building served as a retail location for the F. W. Woolworth Company from 1926 to 1990. It now houses other tenants including a JoS. A. Bank Clothiers store.

Designed by Wiley G. Clarkson and James T. Taylor to be ten stories tall, the limestone and concrete structure was only built as a three-story building. The Classical Revival building includes an elaborate frieze. The building was added to the National Register of Historic Places in 1994.

See also

List of Woolworth buildings
National Register of Historic Places listings in Tarrant County, Texas

References

National Register of Historic Places TEXAS  - Tarrant County
National Register of Historic Places Research Page
Architecture in Fort Worth: Woolworth Building

External links

Architecture in Fort Worth: Woolworth Building
Waymarking Photos
Woolworth Museum

Commercial buildings completed in 1926
Buildings and structures in Fort Worth, Texas
National Register of Historic Places in Fort Worth, Texas
Department stores on the National Register of Historic Places
F. W. Woolworth Company buildings and structures
Neoclassical architecture in Texas
Economy of Fort Worth, Texas
Commercial buildings on the National Register of Historic Places in Texas